The International Sugar Organization is an intergovernmental organization, based in London, which was established by the International Sugar Agreement of 1968, as the body responsible for administering the Agreement. Unlike its predecessors under pre-1968 versions of the International Sugar Agreement, it does not have the power to regulate the international sugar trade by price-setting or export quotas but seeks to promote the trade in and consumption of sugar by gathering and publishing information on the sugar market, research into new uses for sugar and related products and as a forum for intergovernmental discussions on sugar. As of June 2017, its membership consisted of 87 countries.

History

Since 1937, a series of temporary International agreements on Sugar attempted to regulate global demand and supply.  Initially, an International Sugar Council was established, until the United Nations Conference on Trade and Development in 1968 recommended a more permanent arrangement through the International Sugar Organization.

See also 
 Triangular trade

References

External links
Official site

Sugar organizations
Intergovernmental organizations established by treaty
Organizations established in 1968
Sugar
International organisations based in London